Estefanía Ramírez Castillo (born 10 October 1991) is a Colombian rugby union player. She represented Colombia at the 2015 Pan American Games in Toronto, Ontario, Canada. She was part of the Colombian team that featured at the 2016 USA Women's Sevens in Atlanta.

Ramirez was selected for Colombia's women's sevens team for the 2016 Summer Olympics.

References

External links 
 

1991 births
Female rugby sevens players
Rugby sevens players at the 2015 Pan American Games
Rugby sevens players at the 2016 Summer Olympics
Living people
Colombia international rugby sevens players
Olympic rugby sevens players of Colombia
Pan American Games competitors for Colombia
Colombia international women's rugby sevens players
21st-century Colombian women